Cake & Ice Cream is the 14th studio album by American rapper Messy Marv. It peaked at #49 on the R&B/Hip-Hop Albums chart and at #42 on the Heatseekers Albums chart. It is the first album of his Cake & Ice Cream trilogy and includes guest appearances from Gucci Mane, Yukmouth and Keak da Sneak, among others.

Track listing

References

2008 albums
Messy Marv albums